John Mowbray or John de Mowbray may refer to:

John de Mowbray, 2nd Baron Mowbray (1286–1322), Lord of Tanfield and Well, Yorkshire and Governor of York
John de Mowbray, 3rd Baron Mowbray (1310–1361), only son of the 2nd Baron Mowbray
John de Mowbray, 4th Baron Mowbray (1340–1368), knighted by King Edward III and died en route to the Holy Land
John de Mowbray, 1st Earl of Nottingham (1365–1383), elder son of the 4th Baron Mowbray, the Earldom became extinct after his early death
John Mowbray, 2nd Duke of Norfolk (1392–1432), also Baron Segrave, Baron Mowbray and Earl Marshall of England
John Mowbray, 3rd Duke of Norfolk (1415–1461), active during the Wars of the Roses for the Yorkists and Lancastrians
John de Mowbray, 4th Duke of Norfolk (1444–1476), only son of the 3rd Duke, laid siege to Caister Castle in 1469
Sir John Mowbray, 1st Baronet (1815–1899), British Conservative politician and MP
John Mowbray (rugby league) (born 1940), Australian rugby league footballer
John Code Mowbray (1918–1997), Justice of the Supreme Court of Nevada
John Mowbray, a pseudonym used for 13 novels by juvenile fiction author Gunby Hadath (18711954)
John Mowbray, a pseudonym used for Call in the Yard (1931) by crime and thriller writer John Haslette Vahey (18811938)